The 1909 Giro di Lombardia was the fifth edition of the Giro di Lombardia cycle race and was held on 7 November 1909. The race started in Milan and finished in Sesto San Giovanni. The race was won by Giovanni Cuniolo.

General classification

References

1909
Giro di Lombardia
Giro di Lombardia